Herman van Tol is a Dutch mixed martial artist. He competed in the Heavyweight division.

Mixed martial arts record

|-
| Loss
| align=center| 4-4-1 (1)
| Ed de Kruijf
| TKO (punches)
| It's Showtime: Original
| 
| align=center| 1
| align=center| 0:31
| Haarlem, North Holland, Netherlands
| 
|-
| Win
| align=center| 4-3-1 (1)
| Mikhail Avetisyan
| Decision (2-1 points)
| 2H2H 3: Hotter Than Hot
| 
| align=center| 1
| align=center| 10:00
| Rotterdam, South Holland, Netherlands
| 
|-
| Draw
| align=center| 3-3-1 (1)
| Remco Pardoel
| Draw
| Rings Holland: No Guts, No Glory
| 
| align=center| 2
| align=center| 5:00
| Amsterdam, North Holland, Netherlands
| 
|-
| Win
| align=center| 3-3 (1)
| Sander MacKilljan
| Submission (keylock)
| Rings Holland: Heroes Live Forever
| 
| align=center| 1
| align=center| 2:08
| Utrecht, Netherlands
| 
|-
| Loss
| align=center| 2-3 (1)
| Roman Zentsov
| KO
| M-1 MFC: World Championship 2000
| 
| align=center| 0
| align=center| 0:00
| Saint Petersburg, Russia
| 
|-
| Win
| align=center| 2-2 (1)
| Can Sahinbas
| Technical Submission (keylock)
| It's Showtime: Exclusive
| 
| align=center| 1
| align=center| 4:04
| Haarlem, North Holland, Netherlands
| 
|-
| Loss
| align=center| 1-2 (1)
| Peter Verschuren
| TKO (3 knockdowns)
| IMA: Mix Fight Gala
| 
| align=center| 0
| align=center| 0:00
| Landsmeer, North Holland, Netherlands
| 
|-
| Win
| align=center| 1-1 (1)
| Glen Brown
| KO
| AAC 1: Amsterdam Absolute Championship 1
| 
| align=center| 1
| align=center| 1:52
| Amsterdam, North Holland, Netherlands
| 
|-
| Loss
| align=center| 0-1 (1)
| Joop Kasteel
| KO (kick to the body)
| Rings Holland: Who's The Boss
| 
| align=center| 2
| align=center| 0:58
| Utrecht, Netherlands
| 
|-
| NC
| align=center| 0-0 (1)
| Sander MacKilljan
| No Contest
| FFH: Free Fight Gala
| 
| align=center| 0
| align=center| 0:00
| Beverwijk, North Holland, Netherlands
|

See also
List of male mixed martial artists

References

Dutch male mixed martial artists
Heavyweight mixed martial artists
Living people
Place of birth missing (living people)
Year of birth missing (living people)